Daiane is a common Portuguese feminine given name (in English Diane).

People
 Daiane Conterato (1990), Brazilian fashion model
 Daiane Limeira (1997), Brazilian footballer
 Daiane Rodrigues (footballer, born 1983), Brazilian footballer sometimes known by the demonym Bagé
 Daiane Rodrigues (footballer, born 1986), Brazilian footballer
 Daiane dos Santos (1983), Brazilian artistic gymnast

See also

Diane (given name)

Portuguese feminine given names